Wintersong is the sixth album and first Christmas album by Canadian singer-songwriter Sarah McLachlan, released in October 2006. It was produced by longtime collaborator Pierre Marchand and includes contributions from Jim Creeggan of Barenaked Ladies. The album also includes a collaboration with Jazz musician Diana Krall. In 2015, all songs from Wintersong plus five more tracks were released as The Classic Christmas Album.

Track listing

A "sampler" CD exists, featuring similar artwork on a cardboard sleeve, which omits "Happy Xmas (War Is Over)", "I'll Be Home for Christmas", "Song for a Winter's Night", and "Have Yourself a Merry Little Christmas".

Singles
"River" was released as a single from that album in September 2006. The song was performed in mid-October on The Tonight Show with Jay Leno and The Ellen DeGeneres Show and reached No. 71 in the Billboard Hot 100. McLachlan's video for "River" premiered on Yahoo! music, on 1 November 2006. Silent Night from this album was used in an ASPCA commercial

Charts

Sales
Wintersong debuted on the Billboard 200 album sales chart at number 42, selling about 20,000 copies in its first week. The album later peaked at number 7 on the chart.

Wintersong was also the best-selling holiday album of 2006 in the United States according to sales figures from Nielsen/SoundScan, with total sales of 759,000 copies that year.

On 13 December 2007, Wintersong was certified Platinum by the Recording Industry Association of America for shipments of one million copies in the U.S. In Canada, it has sold over 200,000 copies, and has been certified Double Platinum.

On the week of 17 December 2011, the album re-entered the Billboard 200 at number 195.

Personnel
Sarah McLachlan - Vocals, Piano, Harp, Dobro
Pierre Marchand - Keyboards, Programming, Synth Bass, Quartet Manipulations, Vienna Keyboard Strings
Jim Creeggan - Double Bass
Colin Cripps - Guitar, Dobro
Diana Krall - Piano on "Christmas Time Is Here".
Ashwin Sood - Drums, Percussion
Luke Doucet - Guitar
Bill Dillon - Acoustic & Electric Guitar, Mandolin, Bass
Bob Doige - Sleigh Bells
Daryl Johnson - Bass
Vince Mai - Trumpet, Flugelhorn
Brian Minato - Bass
David Kershaw - Keyboards
David Sinclair - Guitar

Charts

Weekly charts

Year-end charts

Certifications and sales

See also
 List of Billboard Top Holiday Albums number ones of the 2000s
 The Classic Christmas Album
 Wonderland

References

External links

Sarah McLachlan albums
2006 Christmas albums
Nettwerk Records albums
Arista Records Christmas albums
Albums produced by Pierre Marchand
Christmas albums by Canadian artists
Pop Christmas albums
Musical settings of poems by Christina Rossetti